Taoist Art (also spelled as Daoist art) relates to the Taoist philosophy and narratives of Lao-tzu (also spelled as Laozi) that promote "living simply and honestly and in harmony with nature."

The artists were "Daoist masters, adepts, scholars-amateurs, and even emperors..." thus an eclectic group of art works were created over time that are as varied as their makers .

Concept 
The philosophy of Taoism traces back to the late Bronze Age and later developed into a set of religious practices. Currently Taoism is considered a "living religion, practiced in Taiwan, Hong Kong, and many overseas Chinese communities, and one that is undergoing a major revival in mainland China today.”

An exhibition called Taoism and the Arts of China, presented at Art Institute of Chicago (2000) emphasized the art of the late Han to Qing dynasties and followed "the transformations of Taoism into an organized religion, the Taoist pantheon of gods who inhabit the stars and the heavens, modes of ritual and visualization, the cult of the immortals, and the role of landscape as a symbol of cosmic structure and process.”

Taoist landscape paintings often depict the virtues of the natural world as examples for man. In the Tao Te Ching (Daodejing), traditionally ascribed to Lao-Tzu, an older contemporary of Confucius, the author evokes the lessons that can be learned from trees in Book II, Chapter LXIV:

Examples of Taoist art

The Dragon Pine

This painting by the Taoist priest, Wu Boli (active late 14th-early 15th century), depicts an ancient pine tree, also called a dragon pine. Both dragon pine and pine exist as yang elements living near water, a yin element. As such, the dragon pine are symbols of longevity and of the Tao itself.

Lao Tzu suggested that trees such as the pine were suitable for lessons in wisdom and calm. The resolute pines in this painting may be seen as a case study in graceful endurance. They are buffeted by the elements, yet respond with the suppleness of their branches in order to survive. Their admixture of rigidity and suppleness allows pines to live long lives, adjusting themselves to each season. In order to strengthened their bodies, Taoists consumed pine needles, cones and resin.

Lü Dongbin crossing Lake Dongting

This Southern Song (1127-1279) fan by an anonymous painter shows the Taoist immortal, Lü Dongbin, one of the famed Eight Immortals. Lü lived during the Tang dynasty (618-906). He was a specialist in Taoist meditative techniques and revered as a healer and exorcist as well as a diviner. He was a skilled swordsman, and his magic sword, named "Blue-Green Snake" is often depicted as a personal attribute in his depictions. As a scholar, he was celebrated for his poetry and calligraphy.

Lü Dongbin often appears in connection with Yueyang Pavilion, overlooking Lake Dongting in Hunan province. Lü often visited the site to drink wine, and it was here that he met spirits of both a pine and willow tree. Lü was one of the most famous and popular of all later Taoist immortals. Stephen Little suggests that he had enormous appeal among both literati and common people, cutting across social and economic boundaries.

Further examples

References 

 
Chinese art